Otto William Geist (December 27, 1888 – August 3, 1963), a.k.a. Aghvook, was an archaeologist, explorer and naturalist who worked in the circumpolar north and for the University of Alaska for much of his adult life.

Biography
Geist was born in Kircheiselfing, Bavaria to Franz Anton Geist and his wife. He had 14 brothers and sisters.

Geist came to Alaska in the early 1920s with his brother Joseph, and worked for the Alaska Railroad, as an engineer on board the sternwheeler Teddy R., and as a miner in Bettles, Alaska. 

In 1925 he began collecting Native artifacts and in 1926 began collecting for the university, with support from university president Charles E. Bunnell. While on St. Lawrence Island in 1927, he commissioned Siberian Yupik artist Florence Nupok Malewotkuk to draw a series of drawings of everyday scenes and people for the university. Some drawings were also included in Geist's report Archaeological Excavations at Kukulik, published by the United States Department of the Interior.

During World War II, Geist helped to organize the Alaska Territorial Guard.

Geist died in 1963 from parasites in uncooked meat (probably bear meat).

Legacy

The building on the University of Alaska Fairbanks campus currently known as Signer's Hall was named the Otto William Geist Building and housed the University's museum.  The museum moved to a new building on the campus's West Ridge during the 1980s, which was also named for Geist.

Geist Road, a section line road marking the southern boundary of the UAF campus, as well as a major arterial road on the west side of Fairbanks and the road connecting the Johansen Expressway to the Parks Highway, was also named for him.

Mount Geist (10380 ft/3145m), in the Alaska Range 87mi S SE of Fairbanks, was also named for him, to honor this “pioneer researcher of paleontology, archeology and glaceology in Alaska …”

References

Otto W. Geist: A Legend in His Own Lifetime, news release by Charles J. Keim, August 6, 1963.
Aghvook, White Eskimo. Otto Geist and Alaskan Archaeology. 1969. Charles J. Keim. Fairbanks, Alaska: University of Alaska Press.
The Long View, "The Austrian skier, the German archaeologist, and the country that sees subversives everywhere," by Ross Coen, The Ester Republic, v. 10. n. 7, July 2008.

1888 births
1963 deaths
People from Yukon–Koyukuk Census Area, Alaska